Jane is a 2016 South Korean drama film directed by Cho Hyun-hoon.

Plot
So-hyun is a runaway who is left alone after her boyfriend Jung-ho disappears. By accident, she gets to know a transgender woman named Jane. She joins Jane and her group of misfit runaways, who are as comforting and loving as a real family.

Cast
Lee Min-ji as So-hyun
Koo Kyo-hwan as Jane
Lee Joo-young as Ji-su
Park Kang-seob as Dae-po
Kim Young-woo as Jong-gu
Park Kyung-hye as Na-gyeong

Awards and nominations

References

External links

2016 films
LGBT-related drama films
2016 LGBT-related films
South Korean drama films
2016 directorial debut films
South Korean LGBT-related films
Films about trans women
2016 drama films
2010s South Korean films